Blood Fest is a 2018 American comedy horror film written and directed by Owen Egerton and starring Robbie Kay, Seychelle Gabriel, and Jacob Batalon. Other cast members include Barbara Dunkelman, Nick Rutherford, and Tate Donovan, with a cameo by Zachary Levi. The film was released on Rooster Teeth's video on demand service and had its world premiere at the SXSW Film Festival in 2018.

Plot
 
A young boy named Dax is watching horror films with his mother on Halloween. When she goes to get them drinks, a deranged patient of her husband, renowned psychologist Dr. Vaughn Conway, wearing a red mask sneaks up on her and murders her. Dax finds the patient standing over his mom's body before his father rushes downstairs and shoots the patient dead.

Years later, a now teenage Dax has become obsessed with horror films as a way of coping with his fear following his mother's murder. Dax is preparing to attend Blood Fest, a horror film festival being held on a massive, enclosed ranch with zones based on different types of horror films. Dr. Conway, who blames horror films for driving his patient to kill his wife, finds Dax's tickets and Blood Fest wristband and destroys them, forbidding Dax from attending the festival. Dax's best friends Sam and Krill convince him to ask their friend Ashley, an aspiring actress, to give him an extra ticket. Ashley agrees and convinces her boyfriend Lenjamin, the director of her film, to get Dax access to the festival.

When the trio arrive at Blood Fest, Dax meets Roger Hinckley, an actor who played the killer in his favorite horror film series "Arbor Day". When Dax tries to talk to him, Hinckley coldly dismisses him and his own films, disappointing Dax. The festival kicks off with its founder, horror director Anthony Walsh, greeting the audience. He gives a speech about how horror is dead, inviting everyone to help him make the ultimate horror film. An army of chainsaw wielding psychos wearing pig masks, led by a mysterious masked person named Red, descend on the audience and begin brutally murdering everyone. Dax, Sam, and Krill realize they have no chance of getting out through the front entrance and flee into the grounds. Walsh makes his way to a control room at the top of the tower in the center of the grounds, where he and his employees are recording the entire festival to make a "real" horror film.

Dax, Sam, and Krill hide in a storage room, where they meet up with Ashley and Lenjamin. Ashley reveals there is an exit at a warehouse at the back of the grounds that can be opened with her pass key, so the group decide to make their way through the grounds to try and escape. They enter a fake graveyard, where Lenjamin convinces Ashley to give him the pass key because he doesn't trust her or the group. Zombies suddenly crawl out of the ground, killing Lenjamin. The others run to a nearby cabin where they find Hinckley hiding. Dax kills a zombie that breaks in by hitting it in the head, discovering the zombies are real corpses being re-animated and controlled by an electrical signal. Dax and Sam fight through the horde to destroy a power box, cutting off the signal and stopping the zombies long enough for them to get away.

The group, now joined by Hinckley, continue on and come upon a zone of the festival based on the "Arbor Day" films. They are attacked by the Arborist, the killer from the films, and Krill becomes separated from the group. Dax, Sam, Ashley, and Hinckley hide in a high school and meet actor Zachary Levi, who is killed by the Arborist when he sneaks in, forcing the group to run. Krill, meanwhile, runs into a group of vampires, but Rain, the lead vampire, does not bite him upon sensing he is a virgin. Krill takes a flaming stake and returns to the school, and uses it to kill the Arborist and save the others. Sam finds a passage leading to the maintenance tunnels under the ranch, and convinces everyone that it will be the fastest way to make it to the exit. Once underground, they realize they are now in Tortureville, a zone of the park based on torture porn films. Sam finds a park employee stuck in a trap and frees him, only to become trapped herself. Just as Sam is about to be ripped in half, Hinckley sacrifices himself to save her. Ashley and Krill get stuck in a bathroom, where Ashley breaks down and admits that Lenjamin had the pass key when he died. Krill comforts her and they end up having sex. The four meet back up and are chased by Red; when they hide in another room, they find a stack of explosive barrels and realize the grounds are rigged to explode. Meanwhile, Dr. Conway is at an interview for the local news. Upon noticing Dax is not there, he abruptly leaves.

Walsh discovers the electronic signal preventing the monsters from leaving their zones has failed, and decides to leave it to see what happens. Dax, Sam, Krill, and Ashley make it to Clowntown, a giant circus tent full of murderous clowns, before the exit. Just before the clowns attack, the zombies suddenly rush into the tent and fight the clowns. The group tries to run, but Ashley stops when she sees a zombified Lenjamin. She manages to get the pass key from him and throw it to Krill, but is killed in the process. Dax, Sam, and Krill make it to the warehouse with the exit door, where the employee who tricked Sam is trying to escape. Krill begins hacking the door open when Rain suddenly appears. Realizing Krill is no longer a virgin, she tears his throat out. Sam kills Rain, but she and Dax are devastated when Krill dies from his injury.

Dr. Conway suddenly enters through the exit door with a gun, just as Red appears and holds a knife to Sam's throat. Everyone is shocked when his father murders the employee. Red is revealed to be Dax's sister, Jayme, and Dr. Conway reveals that he is Walsh's partner and is behind everything; since he blamed horror films for his wife's death, he decided to punish those who enjoyed horror films by turning Blood Fest into a massacre, believing that the horrific deaths of the festival-goers will put an end to the horror genre forever. Jayme release Sam, knowing she is important to Dax, and Dr. Conway orders them both to leave before he and Jayme leave to join Walsh and finish their plan. However, one of Walsh's workers notices Dax and Sam about to leave on a monitor and, not knowing who they are, locks the exit. Dax loses hope and considers just waiting for death, but Sam convinces him to face their fears and fight their way out. They steal a truck from the warehouse and begin driving through Blood Fest to the tower.

Dr. Conway is angry to learn that over two hundred of the festival-goers are still alive. Walsh decides to emit an electronic pulse that will cause everyone wearing a Blood Fest wristband to go insane and start killing each other. Dax is not affected due to not having a wristband, but Sam transforms into a mindless killing machine and attacks him, causing him to crash the truck into the tower. Dr. Conway sees Dax on the monitors and panics, activating an elevator to help Dax escape from Sam. Dax is taken up to the control room where he confronts his father and sister about what they have done. Dr. Conway shoots Walsh and tries to convince Dax that he is doing the right thing. However, Dax angrily reveals that he was afraid not of horror films, but of his own father after seeing him kill the patient as a child. Dax overcomes his fears and defiantly presses his head to the end of his father's gun. Dr. Conway is unable to kill Dax, but decides to set off the explosives all over the festival and kill them all. Jayme has a sudden change of heart and throws a knife into her dad's chest, sending him out of a window to his death just as the sun rises.

Sam, still crazy, breaks into the room and attacks Dax, but returns to normal after Dax breaks off her wristband; the two then finally admit their feelings for the other and share a passionate kiss. Jayme apologizes to her brother for helping their father and Walsh before escaping out the window. As Dax and Sam make their way out of the grounds, Sam wonders if any of the other attendees survived. Just as Dax suggests it is possible, the explosives go off and completely destroy Blood Fest and everything inside.

A post-credits scene reveals a hand breaking out of the ruins of Blood Fest clutching Walsh's staff.

Cast

 Robbie Kay as Dax Conway
 Tristan Riggs as young Dax
 Jacob Batalon as Krill
 Seychelle Gabriel as Sam
 Barbara Dunkelman as Ashley
 Chris Doubek as Roger Hinckley
 Nick Rutherford as Lenjamin Cain
 Tate Donovan as Dr. Vaughn Conway
 Owen Egerton as Anthony Walsh
 Rebecca Wagner as Jayme / Red
 Byron Brown as Mac
 Olivia Grace Applegate as Rain The Vampire
 Christina Parrish as Amy
 Adam Ellis as The Arborist
 Paul Ogola as Billy
 Samantha Ireland as Mrs. Conway
 Geoff Ramsey as Guns
 Zachary Levi as himself
 Gavin Free as himself
 Will Hyde as Masked Killer – Prologue

Release
After Cinedigm acquired distribution rights, the film had a one night theatrical screening on August 14, 2018, exclusively through Fathom Events. The film was released onto Digital platforms on August 31, 2018, before onto Blu-ray and DVD on October 2, 2018. The digital release also includes footage featuring Gus Sorola that was cut from the film as a short film titled Gus Fest.

On August 30, 2018, Rooster Teeth released "Mr. Leadfeet", a short film featuring the character of Mr. Leadfeet from Blood Fest.

The film became available to paid members of Rooster Teeth's website on February 14, 2019.

Reception
The review aggregator website Rotten Tomatoes reported  approval rating based on  reviews. Metacritic, which uses a weighted average, assigned the film a score of 54 out of 100, based on 5 critics, indicating "mixed or average reviews".

In a mixed review, Frank Scheck of The Hollywood Reporter criticized the film's humor, stating, "There are some fun moments... But the humor more often comes across as forced." He mainly criticized the film compared to others in the same horror-parody genre, stating, "none of the meta-styled proceedings is particularly original" and that "Genre aficionados might enjoy the film to a certain degree... But that familiarity is a double-edged sword, since buffs are also more likely to get the feeling that they've seen this type of thing far too many times."

References

External links
 

Films shot in Texas
Rooster Teeth
American comedy horror films
2018 comedy horror films
2018 films
2010s English-language films
2010s American films